Steinsel is a commune and town in central Luxembourg. It is located north of Luxembourg City.

, the town of Steinsel, which lies in the west of the commune, has a population of 1,844.  Other towns within the commune include Heisdorf and Mullendorf.

Like most of Luxembourg, Steinsel has an oceanic climate.

Population

References

External links
 

 
Communes in Luxembourg (canton)
Towns in Luxembourg